"Some Postman" is a song by the band The Presidents of the United States of America, from their fourth album Love Everybody, which was released in 2004. A single version of the song was also released through Apple's online iTunes Store. 

The song was inspired when lead singer Chris Ballew sent a mixtape by post, only to be told later it hadn't arrived in the mail. "Well some postman's grooving to that" he recounts saying, in the making of documentary for the music video.

Track listing
"Some Postman"
"Shortwave"
"Jilted on the Tarmac"

Track listing (Australian version)
"Some Postman"
"Highway Forever"
"Lump" (remastered version from 10th anniversary reissue of debut album)

Music video
The music video for "Some Postman" was released in 2005.  It was shot entirely on cell phones.

Chart positions

References

2004 singles
The Presidents of the United States of America (band) songs
Songs written by Chris Ballew
2004 songs